Arthur Gould Hatch (May 31, 1896 – December 8, 1970) was an American politician from New York.

Life
He was born on May 31, 1896, in Walworth, Wayne County, New York. He engaged in the insurance business in Rochester, Monroe County, New York, and entered politics as a Republican.

Hatch was a member of the New York State Assembly from 1949 to 1957, sitting in the 167th, 168th, 169th, 170th and 171st New York State Legislatures. He was elected on February 14, 1957, to the New York State Senate (52nd D.), to fill the vacancy caused by the death of George T. Manning. He resigned his seat in the Assembly on February 27, when the result of the special election was certified, and took his seat in the State Senate. He was re-elected in November 1958, and remained in the Senate until the end of the 172nd New York State Legislature in 1960.

He was Clerk of Monroe County from 1961 to 1966.

He died on December 8, 1970, at his home in Rochester, New York.

Sources

1896 births
1970 deaths
Politicians from Rochester, New York
Republican Party New York (state) state senators
Republican Party members of the New York State Assembly
People from Wayne County, New York
20th-century American politicians